Silvio Valenti Gonzaga (1 March 1690 – 28 August 1756) was an Italian nobleman and Catholic cardinal.  

Gonzaga was born in Mantua.  He served as papal nuncio to Flanders, 1731–1736, and was elevated to the rank of cardinal in 1738 by Pope Clement XII. On 15 May 1747 he was given the titular church of San Callisto. He died in Viterbo.

He was known as a patron of arts and sciences, and his villa outside of Porta Pia had a botanical collection. He owned a large library, collected the latest instruments of measurement, and sponsored literary salons.
He owned a large collection of paintings (including the Portrait of Lorenzo Cybo), which, after his death, was sold on 18 May 1763 at Amsterdam and the paintings by Salvator Rosa and Francesco Solimena dispersed in several locations.

His nephew Luigi Valenti Gonzaga (1725 – 1808) also was named cardinal. Luigi's brother, Marquis Carlo Valenti Gonzaga (1718-1782), was a statesman and ambassador for the papal state; he also was a prominent patron in Mantua and amassed a large library.

References

1690 births
1756 deaths
Clergy from Mantua
18th-century Italian cardinals
Cardinal-bishops of Sabina
Cardinal Secretaries of State
Members of the Congregation for the Propagation of the Faith
Camerlengos of the Holy Roman Church
Nobility of Mantua